Dupe usually refers to someone who has been deceived into going along with an idea or program. It may also refer to:

People
 Maxime Dupé (born 1993), French footballer
 Tony Dupé, Australian music producer and musician

Arts, entertainment, and media
 Duping (gaming), practice of exploiting a bug in a video game to illegitimately create duplicates of unique items or currency
 The Dupe, a 1916 American silent film
 The Dupes, a 1973 Syrian film
Dupe, an entity from the roblox game doors

Other uses
 Dupe, an organism targeted by mimicry
 Dupe, a duplicated warez release, see Topsite (warez)
 DuPage Theatre and DuPage Shoppes

See also 
 Dup (disambiguation)
 Duplication (disambiguation)